Colvill (also spelled Covill) is an extinct townsite  in Cook County, Minnesota, United States.

The community was located between Grand Marais and Grand Portage on Minnesota Highway 61.

Colvill was located 9 miles northeast of Grand Marais, and 25 miles southwest of Grand Portage.

Kadunce River State Wayside area is located near the abandoned townsite of Colvill.

History
Colvill was named after Colonel William J. Colvill, who for a time lived on a homestead in the community.

Colvill Township of Cook County was originated and established in 1906; it was abandoned during the Great Depression of the 1930s.

References

Former populated places in Cook County, Minnesota
Former populated places in Minnesota